Columbus is a 2015 Telugu romantic comedy film starring Sumanth Ashwin, Seerat Kapoor, and Mishti Chakraborty.  The film was produced by Ashwani Kumar Sahdev, with the music composed by Jithin Roshan. It was released on 22 October 2015 and dubbed into Hindi as Solo Operation by Wam India PVT. LTD.

Plot 
Ashwin (Sumanth Ashwin) is a college student who falls for Indu (Mishti Chakraborty). His love for her becomes so distracting that he ignores his former career goals to concentrate on her.  His zeal begins to annoy her. She irritably ignores him and goes to Delhi. Heartbroken, he follows her and becomes involved in a murder mystery and is unfortunately arrested. When released from jail he finds that she has left for good.  He crosses paths with Neeraja (Seerat Kapoor) who promises to help him track her down. Neeraja and Ashwin start getting close to each other.

Cast 
 Sumanth Ashwin as Ashwin
 Mishti Chakraborty as Indu
 Seerat Kapoor as Neeraja
 Saptagiri as TV Serial Director
 Rohini as Ashwin's Mother
 Prithvi as Ashwin's Father
  Roshan Basheer  as Vamshi
 Nagineedu as Neeraja's Father

Production 
The film had its audio launch at Hyderabad on 17 October 2015, with hero  Daggubati Venkatesh, Sumanth Ashwin, Seerat Kapoor, and Mishti Chakraborty in attendance.

Reception 
The film's plus points are that the growing romance between Sumanth Ashwin's  and Seerat Kapoor's characters are interesting and their chemistry is "handled pretty well". It is further noted that the acting skills of Sumanth Ashwin have "improved by leaps and bounds" when compared to his earlier film works. His delivery was decent and he did well with his comedy. It was further felt that "Seerat Kapoor is quite impressive and has done her best". It was also offered that Misthi performed her part well but pretty much "has nothing much to do". It was felt that the film's second half with its revealing of major plot twists were the film's greatest asset. However, it was felt that despite the pluses, a drawback was found in "the weak characterization of the lead actors", and the fact "some very important characters have been misused in the film", and that "Saptagiri’s comedy looks out of place and does not create much laughter."  It was summarized "On the whole, Columbus is yet another triangular love story which has its moments. Seerat Kapoor’s romantic track with Sumanth Ashwin and a passable second half are some assets. On the flip side, a routine first half and weak characterizations spoil the flow of the film."

References 

2010s Telugu-language films
Indian romantic drama films